Sir Geoffrey Hithersay Shakespeare, 1st Baronet  (23 September 1893 – 8 September 1980) was a British Liberal Party politician.

Life
Born in Norwich, the second son of Rev. John Howard Shakespeare, secretary of the Baptist Union of Great Britain, he was educated at Highgate School. He was a descendant of Richard Shakespeare, the grandfather of William Shakespeare. He served in the First World War. He studied at Emmanuel College, Cambridge, where he graduated with an MA and an LLB degree. He was president of the Cambridge Union Society in Lent Term 1920.

He was called to the Bar in 1922, was Private Secretary to David Lloyd George in 1921–1923, and worked as a political journalist. As Private Secretary, he attended the peace negotiations leading to the Anglo-Irish Treaty of 1921, of which he gave a valuable account in his memoirs, Let Candles be Brought In.

He was National Liberal Member of Parliament (MP) for Wellingborough, Northamptonshire in 1922–1923 and Liberal Member for Norwich in 1929–1931 and Liberal National member in 1931–1945.

He served in government as a Lord Commissioner of the Treasury and Liberal National Chief Whip from November 1931 – October 1932, as Parliamentary Secretary to the Ministry of Health in 1932–1936, Parliamentary Secretary to the Board of Education in 1936–1937, Parliamentary and Financial Secretary to the Admiralty in 1937–1940, Secretary for Overseas Trade from April to May 1940, Parliamentary Under-Secretary of State for Dominion Affairs from 1940 to 1942. He was also chairman of the Children's Overseas Reception Board, 1940–1942.

He was a Director of Abbey National Building Society from 1943 to 1977, and was Deputy chairman from 1965 to 1969. He was chairman of the Standing Council of the Baronetage in 1972–1975.

He was created a baronet in 1942 and appointed a Privy Counsellor in 1945. He died in Bromley, Kent, aged 86.

In 1949 he published a memoir, Let Candles Be Brought In. It was of great value to historians of the Anglo-Irish peace negotiations in 1921, to which he was an eye-witness. Particularly useful is his description of the final hours of the talks on 5–6 December 1921 when Lloyd George presented the Irish delegation with the famous ultimatum that they must sign the Treaty at once or face "terrible and immediate war".

References

Bibliography

 
Mark Pottle, entry on Shakespeare in Dictionary of National Biography, OUP 2004–08

External links 
 

1893 births
1980 deaths
Admiralty personnel of World War II
Alumni of Emmanuel College, Cambridge
Baronets in the Baronetage of the United Kingdom
Foreign Office personnel of World War II
Liberal Party (UK) MPs for English constituencies
Lords of the Admiralty
Members of the Privy Council of the United Kingdom
Ministers in the Chamberlain peacetime government, 1937–1939
Ministers in the Chamberlain wartime government, 1939–1940
Ministers in the Churchill wartime government, 1940–1945
National Liberal Party (UK, 1922) politicians
National Liberal Party (UK, 1931) politicians
People educated at Highgate School
Presidents of the Cambridge Union
UK MPs 1922–1923
UK MPs 1929–1931
UK MPs 1931–1935
UK MPs 1935–1945
Georgist politicians